Before the Dawn was the second album by jazz/R&B singer Patrice Rushen. While 1974's Prelusion was essentially a straight-ahead record with fusion references, 1975's Before the Dawn album was essentially a fusion album.  With this album Rushen brings a fusion of R&B, pop, and rock elements to her jazz foundation.

The album included the song "What's the Story," which was 		
the only song that did not have a jazz artist's sound; it has a more funk tune which features singer Josie James. This would later be compared with songs from her follow-up albums as it showed great resemblance to her work as an R&B singer with Elektra Records. Everything else on the album, however, is instrumental jazz — although instrumental jazz that is mindful of R&B, pop, and rock. The album was a clear step for Rushen as it showed her entrance to R&B music and exit from jazz music.

Her next album was Shout It Out, which would be her last with Prestige Records.

Track listing
All tracks composed and arranged by Patrice Rushen.

 "Kickin' Back" - 7:27
 "Jubilation" - 6:05
 "What's the Story" – 5:15
 "Before the Dawn" - 8:30
 "Razzia" - 9:41

Personnel 
 Patrice Rushen – acoustic piano, electric piano, clavinet, synthesizers, tambourine, cabasa
 Lee Ritenour – guitars
 Charles Meeks – bass (1, 2, 4, 5)
 Tony Dumas – bass (3)
 Leon "Ndugu" Chancler – drums (1, 2)
 Harvey Mason – drums (3, 4, 5)
 Nate Alfred – percussion (1, 2, 5)
 Kenneth Nash – percussion (3, 4)
 Hadley Caliman – tenor saxophone (1, 2)
 George Bohanon – trombone (1, 2, 4)
 Oscar Brashear – trumpet, flugelhorn (1, 2, 4)
 Hubert Laws – flute, alto flute (3, 4)
 Josie James – vocals (3)
 Handclaps on "What's the Story" – Nate Alfred, Reggie Andrews, Thelette Bennett, Josie James, Charles Meeks, Charles Mims, Patrice Rushen, Evelyn Wesley, Jimmie Lee Wesley, Brenda White and Martha Young

Production 
 Reggie Andrews – producer, remixing
 Charles Mims – special production assistance
 Skip Shimmin – engineer, remixing
 Patrice Rushen – remixing
 David Turner – mastering 
 Phil Carroll – art direction, design
 Phil Bray – photography

References

1975 albums
Patrice Rushen albums
Prestige Records albums